Webdreams is Canadian documentary series that originally aired on Showcase and IFC from 2005 to 2008. Each season of the series followed a rotating cast of individuals who work in the internet pornography industry.

Overview
Webdreams was produced by the Montreal-based production company Galafilm. The series was directed by Ziad Touma, Joshua Dorsey, Paul Kell, and Christie Callan-Jones, with Touma, Dorsey, and Gregory Fine as writers, and Arnie Gelbart, Michael Kronish, Gregory Fine as producers. The series originally aired on Showcase as part of the network's "Fridays Without Borders" programming block, which featured adult-themed television programming.

Season 1
The eight-episode first season of Webdreams filmed from January to November 2004, and premiered on September 2, 2005. Filmed primarily in Montreal, the season focuses on the following individuals:
 Dave Angelo, a bisexual performer in gay pornographic films for Colt Studios
 Dugmor, a web designer and pornography producer
 Katrina, a pornographic film actress and host of the web reality series Pornstar Académie 2
 Laurelle, a webcam model for 2much
 Malezia, an emerging pornographic film actress and Dugmor's protégé

Season 2
The second season of Webdreams premiered on April 7, 2007, and consisted of twelve episodes. Edited from 800 hours of footage, the season was filmed in Canada, Amsterdam, Paris, Miami, New York City, Las Vegas, Los Angeles, and Panama City, and focused on the following individuals:
 Angelique, a pornographic actress
 Diesel, a webcam model
 Lance and Alexandra, married pornographic performers
 Uncle D, a pornography producer known as "the Canadian Assman"
 Vid Vicious, founder of the Montreal-based pornography website MSM Crew
 Violet Manson, an alt porn model

Season 3
The third season of Webdreams premiered on September 5, 2008, and consisted of ten episodes. The season was filmed in Toronto, Montreal, Newfoundland,  New York, Los Angeles, Las Vegas, Miami, Buenos Aires and the Dominican Republic, and was edited from over 600 hours of footage. The season focused on the following individuals:

 Chad and Chris, founders of the Los Angeles-based gay pornography website Jet Set Men
 Jordan, a pornography producer
 Maxine X, a Toronto-based fetish pornography actress
 Paris, a webcam model
 Seven, a pornography producer
 Tommy Pistol, a pornographic film actor

Reception
In 2006, Webdreams was nominated for a Gemini Award for Best Direction in a Documentary Series.

References

External links

Webdreams on Showcase (link defunct)
Webdreams on Galafilm

Showcase (Canadian TV channel) original programming
Television series by Corus Entertainment
2005 Canadian television series debuts
2000s Canadian documentary television series